The Samsung Galaxy A90 5G is an Android phablet manufactured by Samsung Electronics as part of its fifth-generation Galaxy A series lineup. It comes with Android 9 (Pie) with Samsung's One UI skin, 6/8GB RAM, 128 GB of internal storage, and a 4500 mAh battery. It is Samsung's first mid-range smartphone to support 5G network connectivity. The Galaxy A90 5G was first unveiled in South Korea on September 3, 2019.

Specifications

Hardware
The Samsung Galaxy A90 5G has a  FHD+ (1080×2400 pixel resolution) Super AMOLED Infinity-U Display with a teardrop notch for the frontal camera, similar to the Galaxy A70. The phone has 6GB and 8GB RAM versions, with 128GB of internal storage. The 6GB RAM and 8GB RAM version's storage is expandable to 512GB via  MicroSD card. The phone measures 164.8 x 76.4 x 8.4 mm (6.47 x 3.02 x 0.31 in) and weighs , with a 4500 mAh battery.

The phone also has a dual-SIM socket, and supports 25W Super Fast Charging with a USB-C cable. It also does not come with a headphone jack.

Camera
The phone has a triple-lens camera composing of a 48MP f/2.0 wide-angle lens, 8MP f/2.2 ultra-wide angle lens with a 123 degree field of view, and a 5MP 3D depth sensor. The 3D depth sensor can work with the other lenses to simulate a Bokeh effect through a "live focus" mode. There is a 32MP f/2.0 frontal camera also supporting the live focus mode. The camera also has Samsung's scene optimizer technology that recognizes various scenes and automatically adjusts the camera settings. The phone also can record 4K video through the camera application.

5G connectivity 
The Galaxy A90 5G is Samsung's first mid-range (non-flagship) smartphone to feature 5G network connectivity, with a starting price of 899,800 Korean Won (US$750).

Software
The Galaxy A90 runs on Android Pie with Samsung's One UI skin, similar to other Samsung phones released in 2019, that repositions the touch area in stock Samsung apps towards the bottom. This enables the user to control the phone with one hand, despite its large screen size. It is also Samsung's first midrange phone to come with Samsung's DeX that allows users to connect the phone to a computer using a USB-C cable. Samsung rolled out Android 10 to the device in June 2020

The Samsung Galaxy A90 5G will be one of three A series devices to be supported for three generations of Android software support; the other two phones being the Samsung Galaxy A51 and Samsung Galaxy A71.

On December 2, 2020, Samsung revealed that the Galaxy A90 5G would be eligible for the Android 11 update with One UI 3.

Reception
Max Parker of Trusted Reviews, along with GSM Arena, praised the 5G connectivity available for a lower price compared to flagship devices, while critiquing the fact that there are flagship devices without 5G available for similar or lower prices. Britta O'Boyle of Pocket Lint positively described the phone's screen, power, and 5G, recommending it for consumers considering purchasing a 5G device.  TechRadar, in its hands-on review, also praised the phone's display and battery, while critiquing the weight of the device and the UI of the camera application. It also called the device one of the five best smartphones announced at the IFA 2019.

References

Samsung smartphones
Phablets
Samsung Electronics
Android (operating system) devices
Mobile phones introduced in 2019
Mobile phones with multiple rear cameras
Mobile phones with 4K video recording